The 2005–06 season was the 83rd season in the history of Elche CF and the club's seventh consecutive season in the second division of Spanish football. In addition to the domestic league, Elche participated in this season's edition of the Copa del Rey.

Transfers

In

Out

Competitions

Overall record

Segunda División

League table

Results summary

Results by round

Matches

Copa del Rey

References

Elche CF seasons
Elche CF